Thattayil is a village near Pandalam in the Pathanamthitta district, state of Kerala, India.

Administration
This place comes under the Pandalam Thekkekara gram panchayat. Agriculture is an important means of the livelihood of the people at this place.

Economy
The main agricultural products are: rubber, rice, plantain, coconut, cashew, black pepper, and ginger.

Bhagavathy Temple
Thattayil is famous for the Orippurathu Bhagavathy temple. Mannathu Padmanabhan started the Nair Service Society Karayogam movements in this village. Thattayil has NSS Karayogam Numbers 1 (Edamaly/Mallika) and 2 (Bhagavathickum Padinjare).

References

External links

Villages in Pathanamthitta district